Wilma Antoinette Lewis (born June 28, 1956) is a United States district judge of the District Court of the Virgin Islands. She previously served as the first female United States Attorney for the District of Columbia.

Early life and education 
Lewis was born in Santurce, Puerto Rico and raised in Saint Thomas, U.S. Virgin Islands. Her parents, Walter and Juta Lewis, were both federal civil servants, working for the United States Postal Service and the United States Customs Service, respectively. Lewis graduated as the valedictorian of her class at All Saints Cathedral School in 1974 and earned degrees from Swarthmore College in 1978 and Harvard Law School in 1981.

Legal career and government service 

She worked in the litigation department at Steptoe & Johnson until 1986, when she joined the U.S. Attorney's Office in Washington, D.C. She rose through the civil division to become deputy chief of the division in 1993. That year, she departed for the United States Department of the Interior, where she served as Associate Solicitor for the Division of General Law. In 1995, she was nominated by President Clinton and confirmed by the Senate as Inspector General of the Department of the Interior.

In 1998, Lewis was nominated and confirmed as United States Attorney for the District of Columbia, the first woman to serve in that position. She served from January 1998 to April 2001, when she became a partner in the litigation group at Crowell & Moring. From October 2007 to December 2008, she served as managing associate general counsel at Freddie Mac. In 2009, President Barack Obama nominated Lewis to be Assistant Secretary of the Interior for Land and Minerals Management.

District court service 
In 2011 she was appointed to the District Court of the Virgin Islands. In August 2013, she was named to a seven-year term as Chief Judge of the court. Her term as Chief Judge ended on April 27, 2021.

References

|-

1956 births
Living people
21st-century American judges
21st-century American women judges
African-American judges
African-American women lawyers
African-American lawyers
American women lawyers
Assistant United States Attorneys
Harvard Law School alumni
Judges of the United States District Court of the Virgin Islands
People from Santurce, Puerto Rico
Swarthmore College alumni
United States Attorneys for the District of Columbia
United States Department of the Interior officials
United States district court judges appointed by Barack Obama
United States Inspectors General by name